Anne Cecilie Ore (born 11 October 1978) is a Norwegian paralympic athlete. She participated in two Summer Paralympic Games, where she has won five medals in horse riding. She also competes among able-bodied riders.

Career 
She competed at the 1996 Paralympic Summer Games, winning a gold medal in riding, dressage, grade 3, and gold medal in riding, kur, grade 3.

She competed at the 2000 Paralympic Summer Games, winning a silver medal in riding, dressage, grade 3, Silver medal in riding, kur, grade 3, and bronze medal in riding, team (together Ann Cathrin Lübbe, Jens Lasse Dokkan and Silje Gillund).

References 

1978 births
Living people
Sportspeople from Oslo
Paralympic equestrians of Norway
Norwegian female equestrians
Equestrians at the 1996 Summer Paralympics
Equestrians at the 2000 Summer Paralympics
Equestrians at the 2012 Summer Paralympics
Medalists at the 1996 Summer Paralympics
Medalists at the 2000 Summer Paralympics
Paralympic gold medalists for Norway
Paralympic silver medalists for Norway
Paralympic bronze medalists for Norway